Axel Aarón Moyano Durand (born 3 January 2001) is a Peruvian footballer who plays as a midfielder for Peruvian Primera División side Universidad San Martín on loan from Alianza Lima.

Career

Club career
Moyano is a product of Alianza Lima and in March 2019, he signed his first professional contract with the club. To add some minutes on the pitch, Moyano was loaned out to Alianza Universidad at the end of January 2020. On 9 February 2020, Moyano got his professional debut for Alianza Universidad against FC Carlos Stein in the Peruvian Primera División. Moyano played the whole game, which Alianza won 1–0.

After returning from loan, Moyano got shirt number 14 for Alianza Lima and also got his official debut for the club on 17 May 2021 against Sport Boys. He made a total of 13 appearances in that season.

On 2 February 2022, Moyano was loaned out to Universidad San Martín until the end of the year. He got his official debut 10 days later, on 12 February 2022, against Universitario.

References

External links
 

People from Lima
Living people
2001 births
Peru youth international footballers
Association football midfielders
Peruvian footballers
Peruvian Primera División players
Club Alianza Lima footballers
Alianza Universidad footballers
Club Deportivo Universidad de San Martín de Porres players